This is a list of international visits undertaken by the secretaries of state of the United States. The list includes both private travel and official state visits. The list includes only foreign travel which the secretaries of state have made during their tenure in the position.

The first secretary of state who made a trip abroad was William H. Seward, who visited the Danish West Indies in 1866. In the early years, most secretary of state visits took place in the North, Central, and South American countries and in the Caribbean. John Hay was the first secretary of state to visit Europe. Philander C. Knox was the first to go to Asia. Cordell Hull was the first to go to Africa. Dean Rusk was the first to go to Oceania.
John Kerry was the first to complete all 7 continents by visiting Antarctica

William H. Seward

 William H. Seward (in office 1861–1869)

John Hay

 John Hay (in office: 1898–1905)

Elihu Root

 Elihu Root (in office 1905–1909)

Philander C. Knox

 Philander C. Knox (in office 1909–1913)

Robert Lansing

 Robert Lansing (in office 1915–1920)

Bainbridge Colby

 Bainbridge Colby (in office 1920–1921)

Charles Evans Hughes

 Charles Evans Hughes (in office 1921–1925)

Frank Kellogg

 Frank B. Kellogg (in office 1925–1929)

Henry L. Stimson

 Henry L. Stimson (in office 1929–1933)

Cordell Hull

 Cordell Hull (in office 1933–1944)

Edward Stettinius

 Edward Stettinius, Jr. (in office 1944–1945)

James F. Byrnes

 James F. Byrnes (in office 1945–1947)

George C. Marshall

 George C. Marshall (in office 1947–1949)

Dean Acheson

 Dean Acheson (in office 1949–1953)

John Foster Dulles

 John Foster Dulles (in office 1953–1959)

Christian Herter

 Christian Herter (in office 1959–1961)

Dean Rusk

 Dean Rusk (in office 1961–1969)

William P. Rogers

 William P. Rogers (in office 1969–1973)

Henry Kissinger

 Henry Kissinger (in office 1973–1977)

Cyrus Vance

 Cyrus Vance (in office 1977–1980)

Edmund Muskie

 Edmund Muskie (in office 1980–1981)

Alexander Haig

 Alexander Haig (in office 1981–1982)

George P. Shultz

 George P. Shultz (in office 1982–1989)

James Baker

 James Baker (in office 1989–1992)

Warren Christopher

Madeleine Albright

Colin Powell

Condoleezza Rice

Hillary Clinton

John Kerry

Rex Tillerson

Mike Pompeo

Antony Blinken

References

S

United States diplomacy-related lists
United States Secretary of State
19th-century timelines
20th-century timelines